The Petite Aiguille Verte (3,512m) is a mountain in the Mont Blanc Massif of the French Alps.

It is located between the Mer de Glace and Argentiere Glacier, and can be climbed from the Grands Montets cable car.

References

External links 
 summitpost.org

Mountains of the Alps
Alpine three-thousanders
Mountains of Haute-Savoie